In computer science, the gulf of evaluation is the degree to which the system or artifact provides representations that can be directly perceived and interpreted in terms of the expectations and intentions of the user. Or put differently, the gulf of evaluation is the difficulty of assessing the state of the system and how well the artifact supports the discovery and interpretation of that state. According to Donald Norman's The Design of Everyday Things "The gulf is small when the system provides information about its state in a form that is easy to get, is easy to interpret, and matches the way the person thinks of the system".

In human–computer interaction, the term of gulf of evaluation stands for the psychological gap that must be crossed to interpret a user interface display, following the steps: interface → perception → interpretation → evaluation.

See also
 Gulf of execution
 Seven stages of action

References

Human–computer interaction